Gilles Müller was the defending champion, but chose not to participate.

Blaž Kavčič won the title, defeating André Ghem in the final, 7–5, 6–4.

Seeds

Draw

Finals

Top half

Bottom half

References
 Main Draw
 Qualifying Draw

Gemdale ATP Challenger China International Shenzhen - Singles
Pingshan Open